Monte C. Johnson (born October 26, 1951) is a retired American football player. Johnson, who never started in college, was selected by The Oakland Raiders during the second round of the 1973 NFL Draft as the 49th player selected overall.  Johnson attended the University of Nebraska and won two National Championships with Nebraska, and one Super Bowl (XI) with the Oakland Raiders.  Johnson was injured in the 1980 season, and as a result did not play in Super Bowl XV, when the Raiders defeated the Eagles. Johnson considers the 1977 AFC Divisional playoff game against the Baltimore Colts, a game known as, "Ghost to the Post", to be his greatest game. Johnson finished the game, which went to double overtime, with 22 tackles despite suffering a broken vertebra during regulation. Johnson became the starting middle linebacker at the beginning of 1975 season.  Prior to that his contribution was the backup linebacker at all positions; he had significant playing time in the Raiders 3-4 defense as a blitzing/pass rushing linebacker and pass coverage.  During Johnson's eight year career, the Raiders played in 11 playoff games including six AFC Championship games and  two Super Bowls.  Johnson retired from professional football in 1981, after eight seasons in Oakland, as a result of a career-ending knee injury he incurred early in the 1980 season.

After retirement, Johnson moved his family to Atlanta, where he currently has his own business, Family Capital Management, a multi-family family office.

References

1951 births
Living people
American football linebackers
Oakland Raiders players
Nebraska Cornhuskers football players